George Edward Deatherage (November 15, 1893 – March 31, 1965) was an American political agitator and a promoter of nationalism. A native of Minnesota and an engineer by training, he authored several books on construction.

He is best remembered for his political activities. He wrote speeches for General George Van Horn Moseley as well as being the founder of a later version of the Knights of the White Camellia and the American Nationalist Confederation. Deatherage testified before the Dies Committee in 1939.

Deatherage was an important player in domestic and international anti-Jewish circles in the 1930s and 1940s, including collaboration with the Welt-Dienst/World-Service propaganda agency headed by German Ulrich Fleischhauer. Both were also defendants in the Great Sedition Trial of 1944. In 1942, the United States Navy declared Deatherage to be a person “undesirable to have access to the work of the Navy Department” and directed his discharge from employment as chief engineer for private contractors on a $30,000,000 expansion project at the Norfolk Naval Base.

In November 1952, Deatherage was living in Baltimore when he wrote to J. Edgar Hoover alleging ties between Presidents Roosevelt and Truman, referring to Tom Clark as a "Texas pussywillow". He further suggested that Huey Long was assassinated with "Washington" being aware "eleven minutes ahead of time".

References

External links
George E. Deatherage discussed in Episode 3 of Rachel Maddow's Ultra podcast (2022)

20th-century American engineers
Old Right (United States)
People from Duluth, Minnesota
Place of death missing
American white supremacists
1893 births
1965 deaths
Activists from Maryland